The 1966 Dwars door België was the 22nd edition of the Dwars door Vlaanderen cycle race and was held on 3 April 1966. The race started and finished in Waregem. The race was won by Walter Godefroot.

General classification

References

1966
1966 in road cycling
1966 in Belgian sport